Polay Kalan is a town, near Shajapur city and a Nagar Panchayat and Tehsil in Shajapur district in the Indian state of Madhya Pradesh.

Demographics

As of the 2011 Census of India, Polay Kalan had a population of 12,268. Males constitute 51.91% of the population and females 48.09%. Polay Kalan has an average literacy rate of 68.54%, lower than the national average of 74.04%: male literacy is 78.89%, and female literacy is 57.36%. In Polay Kalan, 13.17% of the population is under 6 years of age.

Malvi is the local dialect predominantly used in this town. In term of political Support Polay Kalan has been a hub for BJP/RSS.

Economy 
Polay kalan is becoming a commercial hub for nearby villages. It serves more than 30,000 population market. It host a good market shops for electrical appliances, construction materials, general stores, fruits and vegetable, restaurants etcs. SBI and Narmada Jhabua banks also provides banking services here. It also has 3 patrol pumps and one mandi for Pyaj and lehsun.

Education 
Polay Kalan is seeing sudden rise of the privatization of school. It has around 3-4 good quality English schools  along with some  Hindi medium Private and Govt Schools. It has one Govt collage Shree Shalagriram Ji Tomar Mahavidhyalay which provides bachelor's degree in BA and is affiliated with Vikram University.

References

Cities and towns in Shajapur district